John Boys Drawbridge  (27 December 1930 – 24 July 2005) was a New Zealand artist, muralist and printmaker. He was famous for his murals in public places: for the foyer of New Zealand House in London in the 1960s, the Beehive in the 1970s, and for the New Zealand Pavilion at Expo 70 in Japan.

Drawbridge was born Karori and attended the Wellington Teachers College. He was a tutor in printmaking at the Wellington Polytech School of Design for 25 years (later becoming Massey University, College of Creative Arts, from whom he received an honorary doctorate and was also inducted into the Massey University Hall of Fame).

After returning from England in 1964 he was considered one of New Zealand's most significant artists, but fell out of favour with the art critics of the late 1970s and 1980s (his work being seen as too international during a time when regional realism was helping define a New Zealand identity). After his death in 2005 his contribution to the New Zealand art scene has been revisited, on a number of occasions, by an increasing number of champions (notably by Dr. Damian Skinner, of Auckland Museum).

He lived at Island Bay in Wellington for over 40 years with his artist wife Tanya Ashken; they had two sons, Tony and Cameron. In 1967 there was controversy about one of his oil paintings of Island Bay which was gifted to Canada. He was born and died in Wellington.

In the 1978 New Year Honours, Drawbridge was appointed a Member of the Order of the British Empire, for services to art.

References  

Obituary  in Dominion Post, Wellington of 28 July 2005 page B6.

1930 births
2005 deaths
20th-century New Zealand artists
20th-century New Zealand male artists
21st-century New Zealand artists
21st-century New Zealand male artists
People from Wellington City
20th-century printmakers
New Zealand art teachers
New Zealand Members of the Order of the British Empire
Academic staff of the Massey University